West Lancashire Borough Council elections are generally held three years out of every four, with a third of the council elected each time. West Lancashire Borough Council is the local authority for the non-metropolitan district of West Lancashire in Lancashire, England. Since the last boundary changes in 2002, 54 councillors have been elected from 25 wards.

Political control
The first election to the council was held in 1973, initially operating as a shadow authority before coming into its powers on 1 April 1974. Since 1973 political control of the council has been held by the following parties:

Leadership
The leaders of the council since 1992 have been:

Council elections
1973 West Lancashire District Council election
1976 West Lancashire District Council election (New ward boundaries)
1979 West Lancashire District Council election
1980 West Lancashire District Council election
1982 West Lancashire District Council election (District boundary changes took place but the number of seats remained the same)
1983 West Lancashire District Council election
1984 West Lancashire District Council election
1986 West Lancashire District Council election
1987 West Lancashire District Council election
1988 West Lancashire District Council election
1990 West Lancashire District Council election
1991 West Lancashire District Council election
1992 West Lancashire District Council election
1994 West Lancashire District Council election (District boundary changes took place but the number of seats remained the same)
1995 West Lancashire District Council election
1996 West Lancashire District Council election
1998 West Lancashire District Council election
1999 West Lancashire District Council election
2000 West Lancashire District Council election
2002 West Lancashire District Council election (New ward boundaries reduced the number of seats by 1)
2003 West Lancashire District Council election
2004 West Lancashire District Council election
2006 West Lancashire District Council election
2007 West Lancashire District Council election (Some new ward boundaries)
2008 West Lancashire District Council election
2010 West Lancashire Borough Council election
2011 West Lancashire Borough Council election
2012 West Lancashire Borough Council election
2014 West Lancashire Borough Council election
2015 West Lancashire Borough Council election
2016 West Lancashire Borough Council election
2018 West Lancashire Borough Council election
2019 West Lancashire Borough Council election
2021 West Lancashire Borough Council election
2022 West Lancashire Borough Council election

Borough result maps

By-election results

1994-1998

1998-2002

2002-2006

2006-2010

2010-2014

2014-2018

2018-2022

References

External links
West Lancashire Borough Council
By-election results

 
Local government in the Borough of West Lancashire
Council elections in Lancashire
Local elections
West Lancashire